"Spy" is a digital single by South Korean boy band Super Junior. It is the second promotional single for the group's sixth studio album Sexy, Free & Single and title track of the repackaged edition, titled Spy. It was digitally released on August 5, 2012, along with three other new tracks in the repackaged album, which was released offline on August 6.

Background
"Spy" is a fast urban dance song that is reminiscent of a spy film. It samples a selection from the 1995 TV series "Get Smart". On 3 August, the teaser for the "Spy" music video was released on their official YouTube channel, and the music video was released on August 12. The group made their "Spy" stage debut on 9 August on Mnet's M! Countdown.

Track listing
 "Spy" - 3:13

Chart

References

External links
 Super Junior official homepage 

Songs about spies
Super Junior songs
2012 singles
SM Entertainment singles
Korean-language songs
2012 songs